Max John Kidd (born August 22, 1961 in Springfield, Illinois) is a former professional American football punter in the National Football League (NFL). He played 15 seasons for the Buffalo Bills, the San Diego Chargers, the Miami Dolphins, the Detroit Lions and the New York Jets.

Kidd was the highest-selected punter in Bills history. They chose him in the fifth round of the 1984 NFL Draft from Northwestern University.  He was the starting quarterback and punter at Findlay High School in Findlay, Ohio, from which he graduated in 1980.

Kidd was a first-team All-Big Ten and first-team All American in college and won the Big Ten Conference Medal of Honor. He continues to hold the career punting average record for his college alma mater, Northwestern (41.8), where he also holds the single-season average (45.6). 

During his 1994–97 tenure with the NFL's Dolphins, he established the career punting average record (44.2) for the franchise that stood until Brandon Fields joined the team in 2007 and surpassed Kidd in 2010. In 1996, Kidd led the NFL with a 46.3 punting average.

References

External links
NFL.com player page

1961 births
Living people
Sportspeople from Springfield, Illinois
People from Findlay, Ohio
American football punters
Northwestern Wildcats football players
Buffalo Bills players
San Diego Chargers players
Miami Dolphins players
Detroit Lions players
New York Jets players
Findlay High School alumni